The Workingmen's Party of the United States (WPUS), established in 1876, was one of the first Marxist-influenced political parties in the United States. It is remembered as the forerunner of the Socialist Labor Party of America.

Organizational history

Formation
The WPUS was formed in 1876, when a congress of socialists from around the United States met in Philadelphia in an attempt to unify their political power.  Seven societies sent representatives, and within four days the party was formed under the name of the Workingmen's Party of the United States. The party, composed mostly of foreign-born laborers, represented a collection of socialist ideas from different groups, most notably followers of Karl Marx and Ferdinand Lassalle. The Lassallean faction believed in forming a socialist political party to advance their agenda incrementally through the electoral process. Marxian socialists, however, opposed to reformism believed in forming a socialist party as an instrument of organization of the proletariat to propagate consciousness leading to an ultimate revolutionary seizing of state power. They championed strong trade unions, strikes, and boycotts to develop class consciousness through class conflict. 

The party at first had little influence over any politics in the United States on a national or local level.  Much like the International Workingmen's Association before it, the WPUS was widely viewed as socialistic. However, during the railroad strikes during the summer of 1877, the party, led by the charismatic and well-spoken American Albert Parsons, showed some of its power by rallying support for the striking railroad workers. 

Although the WPUS was largely unsuccessful in the strikes it helped lead, on August 6, 1878 the party had managed to gain enough popularity to capture 5 out of 7 seats in Kentucky state legislature.  As news spread around the country of the success of the WPUS, more "Workingmen's Parties" formed in cities around the country, some chartered by the WPUS and some not.

Name Change

In December 1877, the Lassallean-led organization changed its name from the Workingmen's Party of the United States to the Socialist Labor Party of North America.

Footnotes

Further reading 

 Philip S. Foner, The Great Labor Uprising of 1877. New York: Monad Press, 1977.
 Robert V. Bruce, 1877: Year of Violence. Indianapolis: The Bobbs Merrill Company, 1959.

External links 
 Philip S. Foner, The Workingmen's Party of the United States: A History of the First Marxist Party in the Americas
 Philip S. Foner (ed.), The Formation of the Workingmen's Party of the United States: Proceedings of the Union Congress, held at Philadelphia, July 19-22, 1876. New York: AIMS, 1976.
 Workingmens Party of the United States, Proceedings of the Union Congress, held at Philadelphia on the 19th, 20th, 21st and 22nd Day of July 1876. Declaration of Principles, Constitution, Resolutions, etc ...  —Original 1876 edition of the proceedings.

Defunct socialist parties in the United States
Defunct Marxist parties in the United States
Political parties established in 1876
1876 establishments in Pennsylvania
1878 disestablishments in the United States
Political parties disestablished in 1878